is a Japanese manga series written by Kazuo Koike and illustrated by Noriyoshi Inoue, serialized in Shueisha's Young Jump between 1985 and 1991, and collected in 27 tankōbon volumes. The series follows the violent exploits of the toughest cop in the NYPD's 34th precinct, "Sleepy" John Estes – known to his enemies as "Mad Bull" – and his partners, Daizaburo "Eddie" Ban and Perrine Valley.

Mad Bull 34 was adapted into a four-part original video animation released from December 21, 1990 to August 21, 1992. A sequel manga,  began in 1999.

Discotek Media has released the first English language DVD release of Mad Bull 34 on 26 February 2013 in North America, and includes both the original Japanese version with subtitles and the old Manga Entertainment English dub.  Of particular note is that they were able to retain the ending theme composed and performed by James Brown.

Plot 
Daizaburo "Eddie" Ban, a Japanese-American police officer, joins New York City's toughest precinct, the 34th. On his first day he is partnered up with John Estes, nicknamed "Sleepy" by his friends and "Mad Bull" by his enemies, a cop who stops crime with his own violent brand of justice. Mad Bull makes no qualms about executing common thieves with shotgun blasts, even if they pose a minor threat. He often steals from prostitutes and does incredible amounts of property damage while fighting crime. Mad Bull's un-policeman-like behavior often puts him in hot water with his partner Daizaburo and the 34th precinct. However, despite how reckless and illegal these acts are, a good cause is always revealed (for example, Sleepy uses the money he steals from prostitutes to fund a sexual health clinic and domestic violence shelter). Perrine Valley, a police lieutenant, joins Daizaburo and Sleepy later on to help them tackle more difficult cases involving the mafia and drug-running.

Characters  
"Sleepy" John Estes ("Mad Bull")

A giant of a man who works as an officer in the 34th precinct police department. He runs a prostitution ring in the 34th precinct which makes him a target by other gang bosses wanting to take over the territory. Despite Sleepy's penchant for going beyond the law and doing things that would classify him as a crooked cop, he always has good intentions within the law in his otherwise unusual ways to fight the war on crime. When Sleepy was only fourteen, his family was murdered by gangsters, and since then, he made it his mission to kill every gang boss in New York and rid the city of organized crime. His name is a reference to blues guitarist Sleepy John Estes.
Daizaburo "Eddie" Ban

A Japanese-American who is Sleepy's partner. Daizaburo is the foil for Sleepy as he rather does things by the book whereas Sleepy would rather stop crime using brute force. In the beginning of the manga, Daizaburo is used mostly as comic relief, but later on this role is transferred to Sleepy as his antics become more and more absurd. Daizaburo quickly falls in love with Lieutenant Perrine Valley.
Perrine Valley

A lieutenant of the 34th Precinct, she helps Sleepy and Daizaburo on some of the more difficult missions. She eventually marries Daizaburo, first in a scheme concocted by Sleepy in an effort to bring a critically injured Daizaburo out of a coma. Later, she, Daizaburo, and Sleepy are kidnapped by cowboy assassins and are remarried after the previous marriage was presumably annulled. Her name is a reference to American actress Valerie Perrine.
Chief Alan
The chief of the 34th Precinct. He and Sleepy often butt heads due to Sleepy's "creative" police work. Chief Alan often fantasizes about Sleepy being murdered because of all the trouble he causes him.
Nickels the Electrician
 (English)
An inventor with a vendetta against Mad Bull and has ties with the New York underworld. Develops bizarre yet deadly devices ranging from guns built into hard hats to shotguns that strap onto cats. A diabetic addicted to canned coffee that has a particular odor that smells like a mix of sugar and urine. Although his name is romanized in the manga as 'Nickels', his name could be translated as 'Nichols', perhaps a reference to actor Jack Nicholson who the character closely resembles. In the English dub of the anime, he is renamed "Nickels the Mechanic."

Original video animation 
A 4-episode original video animation (OVA) by Magic Bus and directed by Satoshi Dezaki, was released from December 21, 1990 to August 21, 1992.

Manga Entertainment released the series with an English dub on four VHSes between March 19 to September 24, 1996. Eventually, the license for the series was picked up by Discotek Media in 2012, and was released in 2013. Discotek on Twitter posted they no longer hold the license for Mad Bull in December 2020.

Episodes 
 Scandal / Hit and Rape
 Manhattan Connection
 City of Vice / Charging Jackie
 Cop Killer / Good-By Sleepy

References

External links 

 

1990 anime OVAs
2000 manga
Action anime and manga
Discotek Media
Kazuo Koike
New York City in fiction
Police in anime and manga
Seinen manga
Shueisha manga
Shueisha franchises